The Evangelical Lutheran Church of Ghana is a Lutheran denomination in Ghana. It is a member of the Lutheran World Federation, which it joined in 2004. It is also a full member of the International Lutheran Council.

External links 
Lutheran World Federation listing

Lutheran denominations
Lutheranism in Africa
Lutheran World Federation members
International Lutheran Council members